The Arrondissement of Marche-en-Famenne is one of the five administrative arrondissements in the Walloon province of Luxembourg, Belgium. It is both an administrative and a judicial arrondissement. However, the Judicial Arrondissement of Marche-en-Famenne also comprises the municipalities of Gouvy, Houffalize and Vielsalm in the Arrondissement of Bastogne.

Municipalities
The Administrative Arrondissement of Marche-en-Famenne consists of the following municipalities:
 Durbuy
 Érezée
 Hotton
 La Roche-en-Ardenne
 Manhay
 Marche-en-Famenne
 Nassogne
 Rendeux
 Tenneville

References 

Marche-en-Famenne